Kent Hulst (born April 8, 1968) is a Canadian former professional ice hockey player. He was selected by the Toronto Maple Leafs in the fourth round, 69th overall, of the 1986 NHL Entry Draft.

Hulst most notably played with the Portland Pirates from the team's inaugural season in Portland, Maine, claiming the Calder Cup, in 1993 until leaving the team in his final professional season for the post-season with the Providence Bruins in 2001–02.

In 2002, Hulst was inducted into the Portland Pirates Hall of Fame.

Career statistics

Awards and honours

References

External links

1968 births
Belleville Bulls players
Canadian ice hockey centres
Flint Spirits players
Living people
New Haven Nighthawks players
Newmarket Saints players
Portland Pirates players
Providence Bruins players
Toronto Maple Leafs draft picks
SC Lyss players
Windsor Spitfires players
People from St. Thomas, Ontario
Ice hockey people from Ontario